The Great Indian Comedy Show is an Indian stand-up and sketch comedy show in Hindi. The program was first aired in October 2004.

Much of the comedy performed in the program includes: Janta Ki Hajamat, Ratan Re-Imburse, Cutting with Jaggu & Tau ke bole. They usually include spoofs of popular movie scenes and  other television programs.

Cast
Ranvir Shorey
Vinay Pathak
Sunil Pal
Gaurav Gera
Suresh Menon
Purbi Joshi
Sonia Rakkar
Suchitra Pillai
Howard Rosenmeyer
Ashwin Mushran
Kunal Kumar
Manini Mishra

References

External links
The Great Indian Comedy Show Official Site

Indian comedy television series
Indian stand-up comedy television series
2004 Indian television series debuts
2007 Indian television series endings
Star One (Indian TV channel) original programming
Indian television sketch shows